Anna Vikström (born 1957) is a Swedish Social Democratic Party politician.

Having served as substitute during various periods since 2015, she is a permanent member of the Riksdag from 2020, representing the Stockholm County constituency.

She was also elected as Member of the Riksdag in September 2022.

References

1957 births
Living people
Women members of the Riksdag
Members of the Riksdag 2018–2022
21st-century Swedish women politicians
Members of the Riksdag from the Social Democrats
Members of the Riksdag 2022–2026